Wonder Woman '77 is a comic book series published by DC Comics featuring Wonder Woman as a continuation of the 1975–1979 television series starring Lynda Carter. The series was initially written by Marc Andreyko, though other writers later substituted in, with cover art by Nicola Scott.

Publication history
After the success of the Batman '66 comic book series, DC Comics began publishing a similar comic book series based on Wonder Woman's TV series in 2015. Writer Marc Andreyko specifically set out to use villains from Wonder Woman's "under-appreciated" rogues gallery in Wonder Woman '77, as the television series' limited budget did not allow for many of them. This meant the comic series was able to use villains such as the Cheetah, the Silver Swan, and Doctor Psycho, while also incorporating villains from the television series and brand-new villains.

Collected editions

References 

DC Comics titles
2015 comics debuts
Wonder Woman titles
Comics based on television series
Comics by Marc Andreyko
Comics by Christos Gage
Comics by Amy Chu